Yasuhiro Takato (born January 23, 1968, in Okayama) is a Japanese voice actor who works for Aoni Production.

Filmography

Television animation
Sailor Moon (1992) - Artemis
Ping-Pong Club (1995) - Tanaka
Digimon Adventure (1999) - Elecmon
Hunter × Hunter (1999) - Shalnark
One Piece (1999) - Buffalo / Butchie / Mr. 9 / Satori / Hotori / Kotori / Wanze / Aobire / Peterman / Bepo / Zepo
Mobile Suit Gundam SEED (2002) - Kuzzey Buskirk / Romero Pal
Bobobo-bo Bo-bobo (2003) - Mesopotamion Guy / Haou
Fullmetal Alchemist (2003) - Gluttony
Zatch Bell! (2003) - Byonko
Xenosaga: The Animation (2005) - Hammer
Kamisama Kazoku (2006) - Suguru
Desert Punk (2007) - Haruo Kawaguchi
Dragon Ball Kai (2009) - Gurd / Yamu
Hetalia: Axis Powers (2009) - Russia
Digimon Xros Wars (2010) - IceDevimon
Toriko (2011) - Cumin
Meganebu (2013) - Kugishima Sachie
World Trigger (2014) - Shōhei Kodera
Maho Girls PreCure! (2016, eps. 1-26, 50) - Yamoh
Dragon Ball Super (2016) - Botamo and Agu
Digimon Universe: Appli Monsters (2016) - Gomimon
My Hero Academia (2016) - Principal Nezu
Zombie Land Saga (2018) - Romero
Hetalia: World Stars (2021) - Russia
Zombie Land Saga Revenge (2021) - Romero
Dragon Quest: The Adventure of Dai (2022) - Goroa

Unknown date 

GeGeGe no Kitarō (90s), Kuppa, Sara Kozo, Obariyon, Satori

Animated film
Mobile Suit Gundam F91 (1991) - San Erg
Sailor Moon R: The Movie (1993) - Artemis
Sailor Moon S: The Movie (1994) - Artemis
Sailor Moon Super S: The Movie (1995) - Artemis
Tamagotchi Honto no Hanashi (1997, Short) - Tamagotchi Hoshi
Doraemon: Nobita Drifts in the Universe (1999) - (Boy (A))
Kinnikuman Nisei: Muscle-Man Competition! Great War (2002) - El Kaerun
Mobile Suit Gundam SEED: Special Edition (2002-2003, TV Series) - Kuzzey Buskirk / Romero Pal 
Doraemon: Nobita and the Windmasters (2003) - Storm's Underling
Fullmetal Alchemist the Movie: Conqueror of Shamballa (2005) - Gluttony
Doraemon: Nobita's Dinosaur 2006 (2006) - Minion
Dōbutsu no Mori (2006) - Saruo
Doraemon: Nobita's New Great Adventure into the Underworld (2007) - Devil Bat
Doraemon: Nobita and the Green Giant Legend (2008) - Soldier B
GeGeGe no Kitaro: Nippon Bakuretsu! (2008) - Kasa-bake
Doraemon the Movie: Nobita's Spaceblazer (2009) - Guard B
One Piece Film Strong World (2009) - Billy
Doraemon: Nobita's Great Battle of the Mermaid King (2010) - Soldier C
Hetalia Axis Powers:Paint It, White! (2010) - Russia
Tansuwarashi (2011, Short) - Jirokichi
Doraemon: Nobita's Secret Gadget Museum (2013) - Gorgon's spell
GAMBA (2015) - Bōbo
Digimon Adventure tri. (2017) - Elecmon

Video games
Abalaburn as Pooly
BS Zelda no Densetsu Inishie no Sekiban as Fortune Teller
Crash Nitro Kart as Zem
Disgaea 4 as Koji
Dragon Quest Treasures as Porcus
Ratchet & Clank as Big Al

Tokusatsu
Juukou B-Fighter (1995, TV Series) Garinezu / Ghost Kaijin Army
Gekisou Sentai Carranger (1996, Episode: "Bad Wisdom, Merging Caution") - JJ Jetton
Carranger vs. Ohranger (1997) - SS Sutatanzo
Hyakujuu Sentai GaoRanger (2001, Episode: "Which is the Real One!?") - Copy Org
Tokusou Sentai Dekaranger (2004, 2 episodes) - Quotaian Dagonel
Mahou Sentai Magiranger (2005, TV Series) - Heavenly Saint Raigel / Madou Priest Meemy
Juuken Sentai Gekiranger (2007, Episode: "We Muni-Muni!") - Confrontation Beast Fox-Fist Tsuneki
Engine Sentai Go-onger (2008, Episode: "Friendship's Punch" Savage Water Barbaric Machine Beast Straw Banki
Kamen Rider W (2009-2010, TV Series) - Smilodon Dopant
Tensou Sentai Goseiger (2010, Episode: "Out of Control Gosei Power") - Totsneho Alien Fandaho of Nonsense
Kaizoku Sentai Gokaiger (2011, Episode: "The Abare Quick-Changing New Combination") - Daiyarl
Tokumei Sentai Go-Busters (2012, Episode: "An Out of Control Combo to Escape the Labyrinth!") - Mushikagoloid
Zyuden Sentai Kyoryuger (2013, Episode: "Vacance! The Eternal Holiday") - Debo Vaacance
Zyuden Sentai Kyoryuger Returns: Hundred Years After (2014) - Debo Natsudamonne
Kamen Rider × Kamen Rider Ghost & Drive: Super Movie War Genesis (2015) - Ganma Superior A 
Doubutsu Sentai Zyuohger (2016, Episode: "Unhappy Camera") - as Jashinger
Kaitou Sentai Lupinranger VS Keisatsu Sentai Patranger (2018, Episode: "Love Is an Indispensable Part of Life") - Demeran Yatmis
Mashin Sentai Kiramager (2020) - Carantula

Dubbing roles

Live-action
Boy Meets World, Frankie Stichino
Jurassic World (2017 NTV edition), Mr. DNA
Lost, Hugo Hurley Reyes
The Three Musketeers, Planchet

Animation
Monsters, Inc. - Thaddeus Bile
Pucca - Garu / Dada
Thomas the Tank Engine & Friends - Edward (Season 1-8) / Arthur (Season 7-8) / Ned
Timon & Pumbaa - A Snobbish Elephant (one episode)

References

External links
Yashuro Takato at Hitoshi Doi's seiyū database

 Yasuhiro Takato at GamePlaza-Haruka Voice Acting Database 
 Yasuhiro Takato at Hitoshi Doi's Seiyuu Database

1968 births
Living people
Male voice actors from Okayama Prefecture
Japanese male video game actors
Japanese male voice actors
20th-century Japanese male actors
21st-century Japanese male actors
Aoni Production voice actors